Anachalcos is a genus of Scarabaeidae or scarab beetles in the superfamily Scarabaeoidea. It is one of only three genera of African dung beetles that have been observed rolling balls; the other two are Epirinus and Circellium.

References

Scarabaeidae genera
Deltochilini